The Congregational Federation of Australia and New Zealand is a Congregational denomination originally comprising fourteen congregations in New South Wales and Queensland but now including congregations in New Zealand.

History
Forty congregations of the Congregational Union of Australia decided not to join the Uniting Church in Australia in 1977, and some formed the New South Wales based Fellowship of Congregational Churches. Other remained independent. Others formed the Queensland Congregational Fellowship.

In July 1995 the ecumenically minded congregations left the Fellowship of Congregational Churches because of its conservative and non-ecumenical orientation and with other churches  who had remained outside the Uniting Church including the Queensland Congregational Fellowship formed the Congregational Federation of Australia, now the Congregational Federation of Australia and New Zealand. The Federation has also attracted Samoan, Western Samoan, Filipino and Tokelauan churches meeting in Australia and New Zealand.

Affiliations
National Council of Churches in Australia
International Congregational Fellowship
World Communion of Reformed Churches

References 
Source: Description of The Congregational Federation of NSW at Uniting Church in Australia,  Christian Unity site "Appendix 2. Understanding the Member Churches of the NSW Ecumenical Council"

Members of the World Communion of Reformed Churches
Christian organizations established in 1995
Christian denominations in Australia
Reformed denominations in Oceania
Congregational denominations established in the 20th century
Congregationalism